Monique T.D. Truong (born May 13, 1968, in Saigon in South Vietnam) is a Vietnamese American writer living in Brooklyn, New York. She graduated from Yale University and Columbia University School of Law. She has written multiple books, and her first novel, The Book of Salt, was published by Houghton-Mifflin in 2003. It was a national bestseller, and was awarded the 2003 Bard Fiction Prize, the Stonewall Book Award-Barbara Gittings Literature Award. She has also written Watermark: Vietnamese American Poetry & Prose, along with Barbara Tran and Luu Truong Khoi, and numerous essays and works of short fiction.

Early life and education 
Monique Truong was born in Saigon. In 1975, at the age of six, Truong and her mother left Vietnam for the United States as refugees of the Vietnam War. Her father, an executive for an international oil company, initially stayed behind for work but left the country after the fall of Saigon. The family lived in North Carolina, Ohio, and Texas.

Truong completed her undergraduate studies at Yale University, graduating in 1990 with a B.A. in literature. She earned a J.D. from Columbia University School of Law and went on to specialize in intellectual property law.

Career 
Truong co-edited the anthology Watermark: Vietnamese American Poetry & Prose (Asian American Writers Workshop, 1998) with Barbara Tran and Khoi Truong Luu.

Truong's first novel, The Book of Salt, published in 2003 by Houghton Mifflin Harcourt, takes place in post-World War I Paris, and tells the story of Binh, a Vietnamese cook who works for Gertrude Stein and Alice B. Toklas. The inspiration for the novel came from reading in The Alice B. Toklas Cookbook (1954) that Toklas and Stein had employed "Indo-Chinese" cooks. The novel explores themes of sexuality, diaspora, race, and national identity. The Book of Salt won numerous literary awards, including the New York Public Library Young Lions Fiction Award, the Bard Fiction Prize, and a Stonewall Book Award.

Her second novel, Bitter in the Mouth, published by Random House in 2010, tells the story of a Vietnamese-American adoptee growing up in the American South. The story's protagonist, Linda, grapples with a life-long feeling of alienation informed by her race and synesthesia. Diane Leach wrote in The Los Angeles Times: "Monique Truong’s bone is the outsider’s plight, and her pen is a scalpel, laying perfect words down along that nerve until even the happiest reader understands what it means to forever stand apart from your family and the larger society you inhabit."

Truong's third novel The Sweetest Fruits (Viking, 2019) is a fictionalized recreation of the life of the Greek-Anglo Irish-Japanese writer Lafcadio Hearn, as told through the voices of three women in his life. It was named a best fiction book of 2019 by Publishers Weekly, Mental Floss, and PopMatters.

Her novels have been translated into fourteen languages to date.

From 2011 to 2012, Truong wrote the food column, Ravenous, in T: The New York Times Style Magazine. She also received two James Beard Award nominations for contributing to Gourmet. Her essays on a variety of topics, including food, racism, the Vietnam War, and the American South, have appeared in The Wall Street Journal, O, The Oprah Magazine, The Washington Post, and The New York Times.

In collaboration with the composer/performer/sound artist Joan La Barbara, Truong has written the lyrics for a choral work and a song cycle, and is at work on a libretto for an opera inspired by Joseph Cornell and Virginia Woolf.

Truong currently serves as vice president of The Authors Guild.

Books
Watermark: Vietnamese American Poetry & Prose, co-edited with Barbara Tran and Khoi Truong Luu (Asian American Writers' Workshop, 1998)
The Book of Salt (Houghton-Mifflin, 2003)
New York Public Library Young Lions Fiction Award
Bard Fiction Prize
Stonewall Book Award-Barbara Gittings Literature Award
Bitter in the Mouth (Random House, 2010)
Honor, Adult Fiction Asian/Pacific American Awards for Literature
Vom Lasterleben am Kai, editor. (C.H. Beck, 2017)
The Sweetest Fruits (Viking, 2019)

Selected short fiction and essay publications
Vietnam: Identities in Dialogue
Bold Words: A Century of Asian American Writing
An Interethnic Companion to Asian American Literature
"Kelly"; "Notes to Dear Kelly", in Shawn Wong, ed., Asian American Literature: A Brief Introduction and Anthology (New York, Longman, 1995) pp. 288–293.
"Kelly", in Amerasia Journal, 17.2 (1991)
Yale University's The Vietnam Forum
"Many Happy Returns", Food & Wine
"My Father's Vietnam Syndrome," The New York Times
"Why It's Every Person's Responsibility to Stand Up to Racism", O, The Oprah Magazine
"The Hypocrisy of Eating at Mexican Restaurants," NPR's The Salt

Honors
Asian American Writers' Workshop Van Lier Fellowship
Lannan Foundation Writing Residency
Residencies at the Macdowell, Civitella Ranieri Foundation, Liguria Study Center, Yaddo, Hedgebrook, and the Fundacion Valparaiso
2020 John Gardner Fiction Book Award Winner for The Sweetest Fruits
2016 Sidney Harman Writer-in-Residence at Baruch College
2014–2015 U.S.-Japan Creative Artists Fellow in Tokyo
2012 Visiting Writer at the Helsinki Collegium for Advanced Studies
2011 American Academy of Art and Letters Rosenthal Family Foundation Award for Bitter in the Mouth 
2010 Guggenheim Fellowship
2007 Princeton University Lewis Center for the Arts Hodder Fellowship 
2004 New York Public Library Young Lions Fiction Award Winner for The Book of Salt 
2004 Bard Fiction Prize for The Book of Salt 
2004 PEN Oakland/Josephine Miles Award 
2004 PEN/Robert W. Bingham Prize for The Book of Salt 
2004 Stonewall Book Award—Barbara Gittings Literature Award for The Book of Salt 
2021 Dos Passos Prize winner

References

External links
Author's website
Publisher's website

1968 births
21st-century American novelists
American book editors
American women short story writers
American women novelists
Living people
Writers from Brooklyn
People from Ho Chi Minh City
Vietnamese women writers
Vietnamese writers
American novelists of Asian descent
American women essayists
21st-century American women writers
21st-century American short story writers
21st-century American essayists
PEN Oakland/Josephine Miles Literary Award winners
Novelists from New York (state)
Vietnamese emigrants to the United States
Stonewall Book Award winners
English-language literature of Vietnam